Sekar Kathiresan is chief executive officer and co-founder of Verve Therapeutics. Verve is pioneering a new approach to the care of cardiovascular disease by developing single-course gene-editing therapies that safely and durably lower plasma LDL cholesterol in order to treat atherosclerotic cardiovascular disease.

Kathiresan is a cardiologist and a geneticist who has helped define the inherited basis for heart attack risk and made groundbreaking discoveries of genetic mutations which confer resistance to cardiovascular disease. Prior to joining Verve in July 2019, he served as director of the Massachusetts General Hospital Center for Genomic Medicine and was the Ofer and Shelly Nemirovsky MGH Research Scholar. He also served as director of the Cardiovascular Disease Initiative at the Broad Institute and was a Professor of Medicine at Harvard Medical School.

Kathiresan’s research laboratory focused on understanding the inherited basis for blood lipids and myocardial infarction and using these insights to improve preventive cardiac care. Among his scientific contributions, Kathiresan has helped highlight new biological mechanisms underlying heart attack, discovered mutations that protect against heart attack risk, highlighted triglyceride-rich lipoproteins as a therapeutic target, and developed a framework to interpret the genome for heart attack risk which includes monogenic, somatic, and polygenic drivers of disease risk. He has over 152,000 citations and a h-index of 138 according to Google Scholar.

For his research contributions, he has been honored with a Distinguished Scientist Award from the American Heart Association and the 2018 Curt Stern Award from the American Society of Human Genetics. His clinical focus is the prevention of myocardial infarction in individuals with a family history of heart attack.

Education 
He received his M.D. from Harvard Medical School in 1997. He then completed his clinical training in internal medicine and cardiology at Massachusetts General Hospital, where he served as chief resident in Internal Medicine from 2002 to 2003.  Kathiresan pursued postdoctoral research training from 2003 to 2008 in cardiovascular genetics through a combined experience at the Broad Institute and the Framingham Heart Study, jointly mentored by Drs. David Altshuler, Joel Hirschhorn, and Christopher J. O'Donnell. In 2008, he joined the faculty of the Massachusetts General Hospital Cardiology Division, Cardiovascular Research Center, and Center for Genomic Medicine. Prior to medical school, he received his B.A. in history with Honors and graduated summa cum laude from the University of Pennsylvania in 1992 and earlier, Kathiresan attended North Allegheny public schools in Pittsburgh and graduated valedictorian of North Allegheny Senior High School in 1988.

Awards 
 2018 Joseph A. Vita Award: American Heart Association
 2018 Curt Stern Award: American Society of Human Genetics 
 2017 Distinguished Scientist: American Heart Association
 2013 Ofer and Shelley Nemirovsky MGH Research Scholar
 2011 ASCI Member
 2006 Doris Duke Clinical Scientist Development Award

References 

Year of birth missing (living people)
Living people
University of Pennsylvania alumni
Harvard Medical School alumni
American geneticists
American cardiologists
Harvard Medical School faculty